Agnes Erika Aanonsen Eyde (born 19 November 1966) is a Norwegian luger. She was born in Oslo, and represented the club Akeforeningen i Oslo. She competed at the 1984 Winter Olympics in Sarajevo, where she crashed and completed 23rd in singles.

References

External links

1966 births
Living people
Sportspeople from Oslo
Norwegian female lugers
Olympic lugers of Norway
Lugers at the 1984 Winter Olympics